Oylum  is a common feminine Turkish given name. In Turkish, "Oylum" means "volume" "dimension", and/or "depth".

People

Given name
 Oylum Öktem, a Turkish model, actor, and fashion designer and daughter of Tankut Öktem.
 Oylum Şahin, a Turkish actor, and radio personality.
 Oylum Talu, a Turkish television presenter and anchor person of Habertürk (see Turkish Wikipedia article).
 Oylum Yılmaz, a Turkish author, journalist and literary critic http://www.sabitfikir.com/yazar/oylum-yilmaz.

Surname
 Rıza Oylum, a Turkish journalist writing for BirGün.
 

Turkish feminine given names